is a railway station in Toshima, Tokyo, Japan, operated by the East Japan Railway Company (JR East) and the Tokyo subway operator Tokyo Metro.

Lines
Komagome Station is served by the circular Yamanote Line and by the Tokyo Metro Namboku Line subway line.

Station layout
Chest-height platform edge doors were installed on the Yamanote Line platforms during fiscal 2013.

JR East Platforms

Tokyo Metro Platforms

History

 15 November 1910: This station was opened by Japanese Government Railways as a station of the Yamanote line.
 13 April 1945: The station building was burned down by an air raid during World War II.
 1 April 1987: The Namboku Line station was opened by TRTA (now Tokyo Metro).
 1 April 1987: The station facilities of the Yamanote Line were inherited by JR East after the privatization of the Japanese National Railways.
 1 April 2004: The station facilities of the Namboku Line were inherited by Tokyo Metro after the privatization of the TRTA.
 2016: Station numbering was introduced to the Yamanote Line station with Komagome being assigned station number JY10.

Surrounding area
Rikugien Garden can be accessed by walking from this station.

Kyu-Furukawa Gardens can also be accessed by walking from this station.

See also

 List of railway stations in Japan

References

External links

 JR East station information 
 Tokyo Metro station information 

Railway stations in Japan opened in 1910
Yamanote Line
Tokyo Metro Namboku Line
Stations of East Japan Railway Company
Stations of Tokyo Metro
Railway stations in Tokyo